

Finland 
 Nils Rikberg – Toulouse FC (1937) – 1953–57
 Aulis Rytkönen – Toulouse FC (1937) – 1953–60
 Naatan Skyttä – Toulouse FC – 2022–
 Timo Stavitski – Caen – 2017–19
 Teemu Tainio – Auxerre – 1997–2005
 Jere Uronen – Brest – 2021–

French Guiana
Note: As it is an overseas department and region of the French Republic, French Guianan players listed here must meet the next conditions:
They have played with the French Guiana national team, which belongs to CONCACAF but not to FIFA.
They are not cap-tied to France or any other FIFA member association.
 Josué Albert – Clermont – 2021–22
 Ludovic Baal – Le Mans, Lens, Rennes, Brest – 2007–10, 2014–21
 Jean-Claude Darcheville – 1995–98, 2001–07, 2008–09
Donovan Léon – AJ Auxerre, Brest – 2011–12, 2019–20
 Kévin Rimane – Paris SG – 2015–16
 Yoann Salmier – RC Strasbourg, Troyes – 2017–18, 2021–

French players born abroad 
Thus list includes the French players born outside France who represents (or at least they are eligible) France internationally: this means naturalized players and not, and players born in the Overseas department of France.

Born in the French Guiana 
 Raoul Diagne – RC Paris, Toulouse FC (1937) – 1930–44
Odsonne Édouard – Toulouse FC – 2016–17
 Marc-Antoine Fortuné – Lille, Nancy – 2002–04, 2006–09
Mike Maignan – Lille – 2015–21
 Florent Malouda – Châteauroux, Guingamp, Lyon, Metz – 1997–98, 2000–07, 2014–15
 Jean-Clair Todibo – Toulouse, Nice – 2018–19, 2020–

Born in the French Polynesia 
 Pascal Vahirua – Auxerre, Caen – 1984–95, 1996–97

Born in Guadeloupe 
 Taïryk Arconte – Brest – 2022–
 Pegguy Arphexad – Lens, Lille – 1995–97
Jeanuël Belocian – Rennes – 2021–
 Jean-Michel Capoue – Cannes – 1991–92, 1993–98
 Dimitri Cavaré – Lens, Rennes – 2014–15, 2016–17
 Marcus Coco – Guingamp, Nantes – 2014–
 Jean-Pierre Cyprien – Le Havre, Saint-Étienne, Rennes, Marseille – 1987–88, 1990–94, 1995–96, 1999–2000
 Wylan Cyprien – Lens, Nice, Nantes – 2014–15, 2016–20, 2021–22
 Bernard Lambourde – Cannes, Bordeaux, Bastia – 1991–92, 1993–94, 1995–97, 2001–02
 Thomas Lemar – Caen, Monaco – 2014–18
 Yvann Maçon – Saint-Étienne – 2019–22
 Vincent Marcel – Nice – 2016–18
 Jordan Tell – Caen, Rennes, Clermont – 2016–18, 2021–22
 Lilian Thuram – Monaco – 1990–96
 Marius Trésor – Ajaccio, Marseille, Bordeaux – 1969–84

Born in Martinique 
Yannis Clementia – Nice – 2019–21

Born in Mayotte 
Ismaël Boura – Lens – 2020–
Warmed Omari – Rennes – 2021–

Born in the New Caledonia 
 Christian Karembeu – Nantes, Bastia – 1990–95, 2004–05
 Antoine Kombouaré – Nantes, Paris SG – 1983–95
 Jacques Zimako – Bastia, Saint-Étienne, Sochaux – 1972–85

Born in Réunion 
 Didier Agathe – Montpellier – 1998–99
 Ludovic Ajorque – Strasbourg – 2018–23
 Zacharie Boucher – Toulouse FC, Angers – 2013–15, 2018–19
 Guillaume Hoarau – Paris Saint-Germain, Bordeaux – 2008–14
 Dimitri Payet – Nantes, Saint-Étienne, Lille, Marseille – 2005–15, 2016–
 Bertrand Robert – Montpellier, Lorient – 2001–04, 2007–09
 Laurent Robert – Montpellier, Paris SG – 1994–2002
 Ronny Rodelin – Nantes, Lille, Caen, Guingamp – 2008–09, 2011–19
 Florent Sinama Pongolle – Le Havre, Saint-Étienne – 2002–03, 2011–12
 Samuel Souprayen – Rennes, Dijon – 2010–12

Born outside the DOM 
  Samassi Abou – Lyon, Cannes – 1992–98
  Seth Adonkor – Nantes – 1981–85
  Kodjo Afanou – Bordeaux – 1995–2006
  Lucien Agoumé – Brest, Troyes – 2021–
  Zana Allée – Rennes – 2013–14
  Bernard Allou – Paris SG – 1994–98
  Ibrahim Amadou – Nancy, Lille – 2012–13, 2015–18
  Valentin Atangana Edoa – Reims – 2022–
  Ibrahim Ba – Le Havre, Bordeaux, Marseille – 1992–97, 2001–02
  Ivan Bek – Saint-Étienne – 1935–39
  Larbi Benbarek – Marseille, Stade Français – 1938–39, 1946–48, 1953–55
  Basile Boli – Auxerre, Marseille, Monaco – 1983–94, 1995–96
  Charles Boli – Lens – 2021–22
  Roger Boli – Auxerre, Lille, Lens, Le Havre – 1984–89, 1991–97
  Jean-Alain Boumsong – Le Havre, Auxerre, Lyon – 1997–2004, 2007–10
  Eduardo Camavinga – Rennes – 2018–22
  Grégory Noel Campi – Lille – 2002–03
  Bruno Carotti – Montpellier , Nantes, Paris SG, Saint-Étienne, Toulouse FC – 1991–2004
  René Charrier – Marseille, Paris FC – 1974–80
  Néstor Combin – Lyon, Metz – 1959–64, 1970–73
  Karim Coulibaly – Nancy – 2012–13, 2016–17
  Carlos Curbelo – Nancy, Nice – 1972–88
  Mouhamadou Dabo – Caen – 2004–10, 2011–17
  Julien Darui – Lille, Montpellier – 1937–40, 1942–43, 1944–45, 1953–54
  Marcel Desailly – Nantes, Marseille – 1987–94
  Habib Diarra – Strasbourg – 2021–
  Oumar Dieng – Lille, Paris SG, Auxerre, Sedan – 1989–90, 1992–96, 1998–2000
  Martin Djetou – Strasbourg, Monaco, Nice – 1992–2001, 2004–05
  Manuel dos Santos – Monaco, Montpellier, Marseille, Strasbourg – 1994–2004, 2005–08
  Fabrice Ehret – Strasbourg, Evian – 1998–2001, 2002–04, 2011–14
  Patrice Evra – Monaco, Marseille – 2002–06, 2016–17
  Joachim Fernandez – Bordeaux, Caen, Toulouse FC – 1995–97, 1998–99
  Luis Fernández – Paris SG, RC Paris, Cannes – 1980–93
  Angelo Fulgini – Angers – 2017–22
  Djeidi Gassama – Paris SG – 2021–
  Yann Gboho – Rennes – 2020–22
  Dario Grava – Strasbourg, Nice – 1968–77
  Patrick Guillou – Saint-Étienne, Sochaux – 1999–2000, 2001–02
  Olivier Kapo – Auxerre, Monaco, US Boulogne – 1998–2004, 2005–06, 2009–10, 2011–12
  Yann Karamoh – Caen, Bordeaux – 2016–17, 2018–19
  Jirès Kembo Ekoko – Rennes – 2006–13
  Olivier Kemen – Lyon – 2015–17
  Ferenc Kocsur – Nice, Saint-Étienne – 1949–61
  Alban Lafont – Toulouse FC, Nantes – 2015–18, 2019–
  Peguy Luyindula – Strasbourg, Lyon, Marseille, Auxerre, Paris SG – 1998–2013
  Claude Makélélé – Nantes, Marseille, Paris SG – 1991–98, 2008–11
  Steed Malbranque – Lyon, Saint-Étienne, Caen – 1997–2001, 2011–17
  Steve Mandanda – Marseille, Rennes – 2007–16, 2017–
  Loïc Mbe Soh – Paris SG – 2018–20
  Hemza Mihoubi – Metz – 2004–06
  Vincent Péricard – Saint-Étienne – 1999–2000
  Julien Ponceau – Lorient – 2022–
  Ángel Rambert – Lyon – 1968–70
  Brice Samba – Marseille, Caen, Lens – 2013–14, 2017–19, 2022–
  Amara Simba – Paris SG, Cannes, Monaco, Caen, Lille – 1986–97
  Henri Skiba 
  Loum Tchaouna – Rennes – 2021–22
  Khéphren Thuram – Nice – 2019–
  Marcus Thuram – Guingamp – 2017–19
  Jean Tigana – Lyon, Bordeaux, Marseille – 1978–91
  Adrien Truffert – Rennes – 2020–
  Joseph Ujlaki – Nice, RC Paris, Metz – 1953–65
  Samuel Umtiti – Lyon – 2011–16
  Patrick Vieira – Cannes – 1993–96
  Mapou Yanga-Mbiwa – Montpellier, Lyon – 2009–13, 2015–18

Notes

Books

Club pages
AJ Auxerre former players
AJ Auxerre former players
Girondins de Bordeaux former players
Girondins de Bordeaux former players
Les ex-Tangos (joueurs), Stade Lavallois former players
Olympique Lyonnais former players
Olympique de Marseille former players
FC Metz former players
AS Monaco FC former players
Ils ont porté les couleurs de la Paillade... Montpellier HSC Former players
AS Nancy former players
FC Nantes former players
Paris SG former players
Red Star Former players
Red Star former players
Stade de Reims former players
Stade Rennais former players
CO Roubaix-Tourcoing former players
AS Saint-Étienne former players
Sporting Toulon Var former players

Others

stat2foot
footballenfrance
French Clubs' Players in European Cups 1955-1995, RSSSF
Finnish players abroad, RSSSF
Italian players abroad, RSSSF
Romanians who played in foreign championships
Swiss players in France, RSSSF
EURO 2008 CONNECTIONS: FRANCE, Stephen Byrne Bristol Rovers official site

Notes

France
 
Association football player non-biographical articles